Cristian Ciocoiu (born 23 November 1975 in Bacău) is a retired Romanian professional footballer.

Honours

Club

Steaua București
Romanian Divizia A (4): 1996–97, 1997–98, 2000–01, 2004–05
Romanian Cup (2): 1996–97, 1998–99
Romanian Super Cup (1): 1998

Note 
 The 1993–1994 Second League appearances made for FCM Bacău are unavailable.

External links
 

1975 births
Living people
Sportspeople from Bacău
Romanian footballers
Romania under-21 international footballers
FC Steaua București players
FCM Bacău players
Association football forwards
Liga I players